Hate for Hate is a 1967 Italian Spaghetti Western film directed by Domenico Paolella.

Plot
Digger Manuel has found enough gold to quit working. He is about to retire when robbers steal his fortune from him at the bank. Manuel pursues the bank robbers immediately, determined to get his gold back by all means. Unfortunately he is little later confused with them and put into prison.

Cast

References

External links

1967 films
Films directed by Domenico Paolella
Spaghetti Western films
1967 Western (genre) films
Films shot in Almería
1960s Italian-language films
1960s Italian films